The 1990–91 Cupa României was the 53rd edition of Romania's most prestigious football cup competition.

The title was won by Universitatea Craiova against FC Bacău.

Format
The competition is an annual knockout tournament.

First round proper matches are played on the ground of the lowest ranked team, then from the second round proper the matches are played on a neutral location.

If a match is drawn after 90 minutes, the game goes in extra time, if the scored is still tight after 120 minutes, then the winner will be established at penalty kicks.

In the semi-finals, each tie is played as a two legs.

From the first edition, the teams from Divizia A entered in competition in sixteen finals, rule which remained until today.

First round proper

|colspan=3 style="background-color:#97DEFF;"|12 December 1990

Second round proper

|colspan=3 style="background-color:#97DEFF;"|27 February 1991

Quarter-finals
The matches were played on 13 March and 1 May 1991.

||1–0||0–2 (a.e.t.)
||0–3||2-1
||2–1||0–1
||2–1||0–2

Notes:
 Steaua București lost the match (0-3) by decision of Romanian Federation of Footaball for fielding a suspended player (Basarab Panduru).

Semi-finals
The matches were played on 8 May and 29 May 1991.

||4–0||0–3
||0–0||0–1
|}

Final

References

External links
 romaniansoccer.ro
 Official site
 The Romanian Cup on the FRF's official site

Cupa României seasons
1990–91 in Romanian football
Romania